Oswayo may refer to:

 Oswayo, Pennsylvania
 Oswayo Township, Potter County, Pennsylvania
 Oswayo Creek